Maria Wilhelmina "Rie" Briejer (10 March 1910 – 11 July 1999) was a Dutch sprint runner and long jumper. She competed at the 1928 Summer Olympics in the 100 m and 4 × 100 m relay and finished in fifth place in the relay.

References

External links
 

1910 births
1999 deaths
Dutch female sprinters
Dutch female long jumpers
Athletes (track and field) at the 1928 Summer Olympics
Olympic athletes of the Netherlands
Sportspeople from Leiden
Olympic female sprinters